David Higgins (born June 27, 1994) is an American sports shooter. He competed in the men's 50 metre rifle prone event at the 2016 Summer Olympics.

References

External links
 

1994 births
Living people
American male sport shooters
Olympic shooters of the United States
Shooters at the 2016 Summer Olympics
Place of birth missing (living people)